The Proton Persona (CM) is a C-segment saloon produced by Malaysian automobile manufacturer Proton. The CM series represents the second generation in the Proton Persona lineage, and the first Proton model to use the 'Persona' nameplate in its home market. It was unveiled on 15 August 2007 as the successor to the Proton Wira in Malaysia, and the C90 Persona in its export markets.

The CM Persona is based on an extended Proton GEN•2 platform, and was sold as a saloon complement to the GEN•2 hatchback. The CM Persona was succeeded by the C-segment Proton Prevé in 2012. However, Proton continued to produce the Persona as a low-cost alternative to the more sophisticated Prevé. The CM Persona was later decisively succeeded by the B-segment BH Persona in August 2016.

The CM series was also sold as the Proton GEN•2 Persona in some export markets, and it is one of two Proton models that were rebadged and manufactured by the Youngman company in China. Over 250,000 CM Personas were sold over the course of nine years.

History

Post-launch 

The Proton Persona (CM) was unveiled on 15 August 2007 as the decisive successor to Proton's ageing Wira saloon range.
Proton launched a special edition of the CM Persona on 26 August 2008. It was pitched as a premium version of the existing Proton Persona with exclusive kit and luxury equipment. Only two colours were available; Blue Haze and Brilliant Red respectively, and the car retailed for RM59,800.
The CM Persona given a facelift under the name Proton Persona Elegance on 18 March 2010. It featured a revised front grille, headlamps, front and rear bumper, bodykit, and LED tail lamps. The Campro IAFM engine's power output remains unchanged, but was upgraded with a completely new 32 bit ECU from Continental's VDO division. Five trim lines were available; Base-Line (Manual or Automatic), Medium-Line (Manual or Automatic) and High-line (Automatic) along with five colours; Brilliant Red, Genetic Silver, Tranquility Black, Bronze Garnet and Chiffon Green respectively. A sixth colour, Solid White, joined the range in May 2011.

After the launch of the Proton Prevé, the Persona lineup was reduced to a sole Standard variant which was effectively the B-Line model. 
Proton launched the Persona SV (in which ‘SV’ is an acronym for ‘Super Value’) at the Proton Bola! Bola! Bola! Mega Test Drive Carnival on 30 November 2013. The launch comes six months after the introduction of the well-received Proton Saga SV. Like the Saga SV, some trim and equipment were removed in an effort to lower its pricing, but Proton did not compromise on safety as the Persona SV is equipped with dual front airbags, front seat belt pre-tensioners and all-round disc brakes with ABS and EBD. Such safety equipment is comparable to its main competitors, the Toyota Vios, Honda City and Nissan Almera. The Persona SV is offered as a larger and more powerful alternative to the Saga SV and is priced between RM44,938 and RM48,388. In comparison, the Saga SV retails between RM33,438 and RM36,888 respectively.

In July 2014, Proton re-launched the H-Line variant now known as the Executive variant with a different finish to the wheels.

Proton has sold 265,882 units of the CM Persona as of 31 August 2015, since its original début on 15 August 2007.

Design

Exterior 
The CM Persona was largely based on the then three-year-old Proton GEN•2 hatchback platform, albeit modified to fit saloon specifications. The entire section aft of the B-pillar was re-engineered, amounting to a 167mm length extension over the GEN•2. The extended rear overhang incorporates a larger 430-litre boot, while the boot lid itself was redesigned and features space-saving twin gas strut hinges. Rear headroom in the Persona was also increased by 43mm over the GEN•2 courtesy of a redesigned rear roof design.

Pre-facelift stylingPost-facelift styling

Interior 
The interior was redesigned to incorporate a glovebox in the dashboard, which was noticeable by its absence in the original GEN•2. The analog clock on top of the GEN•2's dashboard has been replaced by a digital one that now resides in the digital display in the instrument panel. In addition, the door trim and panels were modified to feature power window switches (which were in the centre console in the GEN•2) and more ergonomic door handles. The pseudo-racing seats have been replaced by more conventional units with improved comfort. Fit and finish has also been improved and Proton made significant improvements to comfort and refinement, in line with this vehicle being more family orientated than the GEN•2.

A revised version of the GEN•2 launched on 3 March 2008 incorporated the interior trim upgrades introduced in the Persona.

Powertrain 
The 1.6-litre CamPro S4PH engine in the CM Persona is the same  unit used in other Proton models, but with an improved cast aluminium oil pan design that reduces potential damage risks. A transmission control unit re-calibration on models with automatic transmissions reduces the hunting of gears and improves gear changes in an attempt to mask the dip in the torque curve in the lower and middle rev ranges. In the following year, the Persona came equipped with a new variable-geometry intake manifold module (Campro IAFM engine) which improves low-end torque and high-rev breathing.

The new Proton Persona CNG Version is the Mixed Fuel From Gasoline and CNG.

The new Proton Persona addressed many of the GEN•2's flaws, but the GEN•2 remained in production and received a major facelift several months after the launch of the Persona.

Export market 

On 10 March 2008, Proton Cars UK announced the new addition of the Proton Persona sedan to the British market, which is known as the Proton GEN•2 Persona, while the Personas sold in other countries (such as Singapore and Australia) retain the name Persona. Besides the United Kingdom, Proton also uses the GEN•2 Persona name for the Indonesian market, and had also been launched in Saudi Arabia on 22 November 2008 and in Egypt on 24 November; the GEN•2 model was also jointly launched in Egypt.

While officially marketed in the UK, Society of Motor Manufacturers and Traders sales figures for 2008 revealed only 4 units of the GEN•2 Persona were sold in that year, ranking the car as one of the least sold car models in the country in 2008.

Proton participated in the RAC Future Car Challenge on 6 November 2011 with plug-in electric versions of the Persona, Saga and Exora, in which the company claimed 2 awards despite their shortcomings.

The Persona was rebadged and manufactured by the Chinese car manufacturer Europestar as the Youngman Lotus L3 in China. Production ran from 2009 to 2013. A 1.5 and 1.6 litre engine were available paired with a 5 speed manual and 4 speed automatic gearbox.

On 12 July 2018, 13 units of Proton Persona CM were exported to Middle East countries, together with 440 units of Proton Gen2.

Reception

Awards 
 2011 Best Practices Award – Value-for-Money Car of the Year (1.31 and Above) Malaysia Excellence Awards – Frost & Sullivan
 2008 Asian Auto – Bosch Fuel Efficiency Awards – 1st place Family Car category (reported average fuel consumption of 6.8 L/100 km (42 mpg-imp; 35 mpg-US).[12] )
 2008 Frost & Sullivan Best Model of the Year.

References 

Persona (CM)
Compact cars
Cars introduced in 2007
2010s cars
Touring cars